Saint-Ferdinand is a municipality in the Centre-du-Québec region of the province of Quebec in Canada.  It is notable for its location on the shores of Lake William on the Bécancour River, nestled within the Appalachian foothills, making Saint-Ferdinand a popular vacation spot in both summer (for sailing and surface water sports) and winter (for snowmobiling and ATV riding).

St-Ferdinand was once home to a large health care facility, the St-Julien Hospital, founded in 1870; however, rural exodus and the establishment of more advanced facilities in greater population centres such as Quebec City led to the indefinite closing of the facility in 2003, after several years of reduced operations as a long-term care facility.

Saint-Ferdinand has one elementary school, École Notre-Dame.

References

Municipalities in Quebec
Incorporated places in Centre-du-Québec
Canada geography articles needing translation from French Wikipedia